Simonot is a French surname, derived from Simmonds. Notable people with the surname include:

 Chantal Simonot, member of the European Parliament
 Renée Simonot (1911–2021), French actress

External links
http://freepages.rootsweb.com/~stanier/family/S-Simmonds.html

French-language surnames